Rosemarie Trockel (born 13 November 1952) is a German conceptual artist. She has made drawings, paintings, sculptures, videos and installations, and has worked in mixed media. From 1985, she made pictures using knitting-machines. She is a professor at the Kunstakademie Düsseldorf, in Düsseldorf in Nordrhein-Westfalen.

Life 

Trockel was born on 13 November 1952 in Schwerte, in Nordrhein-Westfalen in West Germany. Between 1974 and 1978, she studied anthropology, mathematics, sociology and theology while also studying at the Werkkunstschule of Cologne, at a time when the influence of Joseph Beuys was very strong there.

In the early 1980s, she met members of the Mülheimer Freiheit artist group founded by Jiří Georg Dokoupil and Walter Dahn, and exhibited at the women-only gallery of Monika Sprüth in Cologne.

Work 

In 1985, Trockel began to make large-scale paintings produced on industrial knitting machines. These regularly featured geometric motifs or logos such as the Playboy Bunny or a hammer and sickle, and the trademark: Made in West Germany. During the 1980s, she also worked for the magazine Eau de Cologne, which was focused on the work of women artists.
In 1994, she created the Frankfurter Engel monument for the city of Frankfurt. Since the late 1990s, she has worked extensively with clay and has also continued to produce both hand and machine knitted "paintings". Several of these paintings were exhibited in a retrospective, Post-Menopause, at the Museum Ludwig in Cologne in 2005. In 2011, Trockel won the Wolf Prize for painting. In 2012, an exhibition of her work travelled from the Museo Nacional Centro de Arte Reina Sofia in Madrid to the New Museum in New York, the Serpentine Gallery in London and the Kunst- und Ausstellungshalle der Bundesrepublik Deutschland in Bonn.

Trockel's work often criticises the work of other artists, or artistic styles such as minimal art.

Exhibitions 

 2005: Post-Menopause, Museum Ludwig, Cologne
 2009: Rebelle: Art & Feminism 1969–2009, Museum voor Moderne Kunst Arnhem, Arnhem, Holland
 2012–2013:  Rosemarie Trockel: A Cosmos: Madrid, New York, London, Bonn
 2015: Märzôschnee ûnd Wiebôrweh sand am Môargô niana më, Kunsthaus Bregenz, Bregenz, Austria
 2018: The Same Different, Moderna Museet, Malmö, Sweden.

References

Further reading 

 J. Koether (1987). Interview with Rosemarie Trockel. Flash Art (International) 134, pages 40–42
 Sidra Stich (editor) (1991). Rosemarie Trockel (exhibition catalogue). Boston: The Institute of Contemporary Art; Berkeley: University Art Museum.
 Birte Frenssen, Rosemarie Trockel (1998). Rosemarie Trockel, Werkgruppen 1986–1998 : Köln, Brüssel, Paris, Wien I, Wien II, Opladen, Schwerte, Düren, Hamburg (exhibition catalogue). Köln: Oktagon.
 G. Theewen (editor) (1997). Rosemarie Trockel: Herde. Köln: Salon Verlag.

1952 births
Living people
People from Schwerte
German conceptual artists
German printmakers
Wolf Prize in Arts laureates
Academic staff of Kunstakademie Düsseldorf
Women printmakers
German contemporary artists
Members of the Academy of Arts, Berlin
Honorary Members of the Royal Academy
Women conceptual artists
21st-century German women artists